William W. Upton (July 11, 1817 – January 23, 1896) was an American jurist and politician. He served as Oregon’s  8th Chief Justice of the state’s highest court. William Upton served from 1867 until 1874 on the Oregon Supreme Court before appointment to a position with the United States Treasury in 1877. A native of New York, he was elected to the state legislatures in Michigan, California, and Oregon.

Early life
Upton was born on July 11, 1817 in Victor, New York. There he attended Lima Academy. Later he moved to Michigan, where in 1840 he was admitted to that state’s bar. He also served in the Michigan State Legislature. Then in 1852 he moved to California. In California he was elected to the state legislature in 1856. Then in 1861 he was the district attorney for Sacramento County, California.

Oregon
In 1865 William Upton immigrated north to Oregon. The following year he served in the Oregon House of Representatives as a Republican from Multnomah County. Then in December 1867, Upton was appointed to the Oregon Supreme Court by Oregon Governor George L. Woods to replace Erasmus D. Shattuck who had resigned. The next year Upton won a full six-year term that ended in 1874. While on the bench he was chief justice from 1872 until 1874. He also wrote a 17-page dissent in the legislative delegation case of Brown v. Fleischner, 4 Or 132, (1871), which would be overturned using Upton’s argument in Shattuck v. Kincaid, 31 Or. 379 (1897). Former justice Shattuck would then replace Upton on the court.

Later life
Upon leaving the court, Upton was appointed to a position in the United States Treasury. President Rutherford B. Hayes made Upton the second comptroller of the Treasury in 1877. He kept that position until 1885 and then died on January 23, 1896, in Washington, DC.

References

1817 births
1896 deaths
19th-century American politicians
19th-century American judges
Republican Party members of the Oregon House of Representatives
Members of the Michigan House of Representatives
Republican Party members of the California State Assembly
Chief Justices of the Oregon Supreme Court
District attorneys in California
Michigan lawyers
People from Victor, New York
19th-century American lawyers
Justices of the Oregon Supreme Court